The greenface aulonocara (Aulonocara saulosi) is a species of haplochromine cichlid which is endemic to Lake Malawi.

It is found in Malawi and Tanzania, is widespread in Lake Malawi but is nowhere common and it is threatened by collection for the aquarium trade.

The specific name honours Saulos Mwale, of Salima, Malawi, who worked as a diver and mechanic for the cichlid exporter Stuart M. Grant and who discovered a number of Malawian cichlids.

References

Greenface aulanocara
Taxa named by Manfred K. Meyer
Taxa named by Rüdiger Riehl
Taxa named by Horst Zetzsche
Fish described in 1987
Fish of Lake Malawi
Taxonomy articles created by Polbot